Numerous biologists (malacologists) and citizen scientists, including many scuba divers, study the marine mollusks known as opisthobranchs, which are a large and diverse group of shelled and (mostly) shell-less, saltwater gastropods, the common name for which is sea slugs (including nudibranchs, sacoglossans, etc) and bubble snails. Symposia and workshops on opisthobranchs are meetings where those who specialize in studying these animals meet in order to share ideas, information, and knowledge.

History 

Meetings of an informal group of opisthobranch scientists have occurred in the past. Numerous examples are listed on the Sea Slug Forum website.

A few are listed here:

 1st International Workshop of Opisthobranchs, Menfi, Italy, 1999.
 2nd International Workshop on Opisthobranchia, Bonn, Germany, 2006.
 3rd International Workshop on Opisthobranchs, Vigo, Spain, 2010.
 4th International Workshop on Opisthobranchs, Santa Cruz, USA, 24–27 June 2012 

 5th International Workshop on Opisthobranchs, Porto, Portugal, 2015

Planned workshop

 6th International Workshop on Heterobranchs, Perth, Australia, 2018

Other meet-ups listed on Sea Slug Forum:

 1st opisthobranch course in Venezuela, 2006
 Molluscan Forum, London, 2006
 Malacological conference in Ukraine, 2006
 Opisthobranch Symposium, Seattle, USA, 2006
 World Congress of Malacology, Perth, 2003
 Western Society of Malacologists Annual Meeting, 2003
 Announcing a course on Mollusca, 2002
 World Congress of Malacology, Perth, 2004
 WSM Opisthobranch Talks, July 2002
 Opisthobranch Symposium at WSM, June 2001

A day to celebrate sea slugs
A concept which has been raised at these meetings is the idea of a calendar day on which to celebrate nudibranchs or sea slugs in general. In 2015, in Southern California, "Sea Slug Day" was October 29, "the birthday of Terry Gosliner from the San Francisco's California Academy of Sciences" (Gosliner is an expert on nudibranchs). Alternatively,  "International Nudibranch Day" was suggested in Australia.

References

External links 
 The Sea Slug Forum, International
 Nudibranchs of the Sunshine Coast, Queensland, Australia
 The Slug Site
 Sea Slugs of Hawaii

Academic conferences
Science conferences